Jeremy Derean Kimbrough (born May 22, 1991) is a former American football linebacker. He played college football at Appalachian State and was signed as an undrafted free agent by the Washington Redskins of the National Football League (NFL).

He spent his rookie season on injured reserve due to a torn labrum, and was cut during the 2014 preseason. Kimbrough then went on to work for NASCAR, graduating through their Drive for Diversity crew development program in 2016. He currently works as a front tire carrier of the No. 99 team driven by Daniel Suárez in the NASCAR Cup Series. He previously worked with the No. 1 team driven by Kyle Busch.

References

1991 births
Living people
Appalachian State Mountaineers football players
American football linebackers
African-American players of American football
People from Decatur, Georgia
Players of American football from Georgia (U.S. state)
Sportspeople from DeKalb County, Georgia
21st-century African-American sportspeople
Washington Redskins players
NASCAR people